Highland Pines is a residential subdivision in the Nankipooh Community (unincorporated) of Columbus, Muscogee County, Georgia.  Highland Pines was developed in the late 1940s and early 1950s consisting of small single family homes.

References

Columbus metropolitan area, Georgia
Neighborhoods in Columbus, Georgia